McBain Rural Agricultural School is a K-12 public school in McBain, Michigan. It is within the McBain Rural Agricultural School District.

In 2015 the school posted a job advertisement for a superintendent stating that the applicant must have "a strong Christian background and philosophy". The quote was removed after the American Civil Liberties Union criticized it, and the school made an apology.

References

External links
 McBain Rural Agricultural School

Public schools in Michigan
School districts in Michigan
Missaukee County, Michigan
Education in Missaukee County, Michigan